Starominskaya is a rural locality (a stanitsa) and the administrative center of Starominsky District in Krasnodar Krai, Russia. Population:

References

Rural localities in Krasnodar Krai
Kuban Oblast